HotHouse Theatre is a professional theatre company based in Albury–Wodonga on the border of New South Wales and Victoria, Australia.

It evolved from the Murray River Performing Group which was established in 1979.

HotHouse Theatre is resident in the Butter Factory Theatre in Wodonga, and also manages a farmhouse outside Albury for the company’s residency programs.

References

External links
 Official website

Theatre companies in Australia
Performing arts in Victoria (Australia)
Albury, New South Wales
1979 establishments in Australia
Culture of New South Wales